The 1897–98 season was the 25th Scottish football season in which Dumbarton competed at national level entering the Scottish Cup.  In addition Dumbarton played in the Dumbartonshire Cup.

Scottish Cup
Dumbarton were knocked out in the first round by St Bernards, after a 1–1 draw.

Dumbartonshire Cup
Dumbarton won the Dumbartonshire Cup for the ninth time, beating Vale of Leven in the final.

Friendlies
In the absence of any league commitments, the Dumbarton committee had to work hard to bring together a fixture list which would meet the club's financial needs.

During the season, 23 'friendly' matches were arranged, where there was much to be pleased about. There was an impressive unbeaten run of 9 games at the beginning of the season, several wins against league opposition and a successful 'mini' tour of the highlands during the New Year holidays.  In all 13 were won, 4 drawn and 6 lost, scoring 69 goals and conceding 49.

Player statistics
Amongst those players leaving the club was internationalist Leitch Keir.  A servant to the club since its cup winning season of 1882–83, Keir decided to move on to Motherwell.

Only includes appearances and goals in competitive Scottish Cup matches.

International caps

William Thomson earned his third and fourth caps against Wales and Ireland respectively in the 1898 British Home Championship.

Representative match
A Dumbartonshire XI played against a Lanarkshire XI on 29 January 1898 in which Docherty, Daniel Thomson, William Thomson, Lewis Mackie and Speedie were all selected to play - Willie Speedie scored the Dumbarton county goal in the 1–1 draw.

Reserve team
Dumbarton lost in the first round of the Scottish Second XI Cup to Queen's Park.

References

Dumbarton F.C. seasons
Scottish football clubs 1897–98 season